Newport Television, LLC was a television station holding company founded by Providence Equity Partners and Sandy DiPasquale in 2007 to acquire the television stations owned by Clear Channel Communications.

History
In September 2007, Newport agreed to sell KFTY and KVOS-TV to LK Station Group LLC for $26.6 million. The deal was set to be completed in March 2008 but eventually collapsed due to LK's lender refusing to provide the funding; KFTY (now KEMO-TV) and KVOS have since been sold to other companies. As of October 10, 2007, Newport had agreed to sell KION-TV, KMUV-LP, K44DN, KKFX-CA, KCOY-TV to Cowles Publishing Company for $41 million. Newport's purchase of the Clear Channel stations and those being resold were granted conditional Federal Communications Commission (FCC) approval, subject to divestitures of media properties owned by other affiliates of Providence Equity Partners in several other markets. The entire deal closed on March 14, 2008 after several stations, in addition to those being divested by Newport, were placed into trust companies.

In March 2012, Providence Equity Partners began to explore strategic alternatives for Newport Television, which may lead to a sale of the group. In July 2012, it was officially confirmed that Nexstar Broadcasting Group would acquire twelve of Newport's stations, Sinclair Broadcast Group would acquire six, and Cox Media Group would acquire four. As part of the same deal, Newport's CMS operations, branded as Inergize Digital, would go to Nexstar. This deal was followed eight days later by the announcement that WXXA-TV in Albany, New York would be sold to Shield Media, LLC, who would then enter into joint sales and shared services agreements with Young Broadcasting's WTEN.

Four other Newport stations were not part of either of the July 2012 deals, with the company continuing to pursue buyers for those stations; Nexstar would announce its acquisition of two of those stations, KGET-TV in Bakersfield, California and KGPE in Fresno, on November 5. On November 26, Newport announced that KMTR would be sold to Fisher Communications. Because Fisher already owned KVAL-TV, Fisher assigned the rights to acquire the FCC license to Roberts Media, LLC (a company wholly unrelated to the bankrupt Roberts Broadcasting), which Fisher then entered into a Joint Sales and Shared Services Agreement with KVAL.

On October 23, the FCC granted approval to the sale of the Jacksonville and Tulsa stations to Cox, plus the Albany station to Shield Media. This was followed the next day by the FCC approval of the July sale of the stations to Nexstar except for the two in Little Rock being sold to Mission Broadcasting, which were later approved on December 10. On November 19, the FCC granted approval of the remaining stations from the July deal to Sinclair.

Nineteen of the stations involved in the July deal were consummated on December 3, 2012. On the same day, Sinclair announced that they would acquire non-license assets of WHAM-TV, while the license was transferred to Deerfield Media. On January 23, 2013, the FCC granted approvals of the Newport California stations to Nexstar; and on January 30, the FCC granted approval to the WHAM transaction to Sinclair. On April 24, 2013, the FCC granted its approval on Newport's final station, KMTR to Roberts Media. This was after an announcement that Fisher was being sold to Sinclair for $373 million, two weeks prior. On June 1, the KMTR sale was consummated, completing the disestablishment of the company.

Former Newport-owned Stations
Stations are arranged alphabetically by state and by city of license.

Notes:
 1 The licenses and other FCC assets of these stations were owned by High Plains Broadcasting, Inc. because of an ownership conflict (Providence Equity Partners also held a 19 percent ownership interest in the Spanish-language network Univision). However, Newport Television operated these stations under a shared services agreement (SSA).
 2 Owned by Mercury Broadcasting Company, Newport operated KMTW under a local marketing agreement with KSAS.
 3 Owned by Nexstar Broadcasting Group, Newport operated WLYH under a local marketing agreement with WHP.

Former Subchannel Network
 Variety Television Network (VTV)

References

Defunct television broadcasting companies of the United States
IHeartMedia
Companies based in Kansas City, Missouri
American companies established in 2007
Mass media companies established in 2007
Mass media companies disestablished in 2013
2013 disestablishments in Missouri
2013 mergers and acquisitions
Providence Equity Partners companies
Sinclair Broadcast Group
Nexstar Media Group
Cox Media Group